Bathelium is a genus of lichen-forming fungi in the family Trypetheliaceae. The genus was circumscribed in 1803 by Swedish lichenologist Erik Acharius, with Bathelium mastoideum assigned as the type species.

Species
Bathelium albidoporum 
Bathelium austroafricanum 
Bathelium boliviense  – Bolivia
Bathelium carolinianum 
Bathelium compositum 
Bathelium connivens 
Bathelium duplex 
Bathelium flavostiolatum  – Bolivia
Bathelium inspersomastoideum  – Bolivia
Bathelium lineare 
Bathelium madreporiforme 
Bathelium mastoideum 
Bathelium megaleium 
Bathelium meristosporum 
Bathelium mirabile  – Bolivia
Bathelium nigroporum 
Bathelium oligosporum 
Bathelium ostendatum 
Bathelium phaeomelodes 
Bathelium porinosporum 
Bathelium pruinolucens 
Bathelium pruinosum  – Bolivia
Bathelium sphaericum 
Bathelium subalbens 
Bathelium sundaicum 
Bathelium tuberculosum 
Bathelium varium 
Bathelium velatum

References

Trypetheliaceae
Lichen genera
Dothideomycetes genera
Taxa described in 1803
Taxa named by Erik Acharius